Guess Who is a studio album by Slim Whitman, released in 1971 on United Artists Records.

Track listing 
The album was issued in the United States and Canada by United Artists Records as a 12-inch long-playing record, catalog number UAS 6783.

In the UK, it was released under the title Snowbird, catalog number UAS 29151.

Charts

References 

1971 albums
Slim Whitman albums
United Artists Records albums
Albums produced by Pete Drake